Narela Assembly constituency is one of the 230 constituencies of Madhya Pradesh. It comes under Bhopal district. Narela Assembly seat came into existence in the year 2008.

Members of the Legislative Assembly

Election results

References

Bhopal district
Assembly constituencies of Madhya Pradesh